Dalal Abdul Hafith Salameh (born 4 October 1965) is a Palestinian activist and former politician. She was one of the first group of women elected to the Palestinian Legislative Council  in 1996.

Biography
Salameh was born in Nablus in 1965 and grew up in the Balata refugee camp. She was educated at the UNRWA Balata Basic School for Girls, and joined Fatah in 1977, eventually becoming a member of its central committee. She attended An-Najah National University, where she headed the public relations for the student council. During her time at university she was placed under house arrest by Israeli authorities due to her activism. After earning a BA in biology, she gained an MA in international studies at Birzeit University.

In the 1996 elections to the Legislative Council, she was a Fatah candidate in Nablus, and was one of five women elected, becoming the first female Palestinian MPs. She remained on the Legislative Council until the 2006 elections. She subsequently led the Nablus-based General Union for Palestinian Women.

References

1965 births
Living people
An-Najah National University alumni
Birzeit University alumni
Fatah members
Members of the 1996 Palestinian Legislative Council
Palestinian women in politics
Central Committee of Fatah members